The Tigrinya people, also known as Tigrigna, are an ethnic group native to Eritrea. They speak the Tigrinya language. There also exists a sizable Tigrinya community in the diaspora.

History 
One view believes that the name comes from the word , meaning "she ascended". The word  "they ascended" describes the ascension of the earliest indigenous people to the mountainous highlands of Eritrea as the plateau's first settlers. The Tigrinya tribe were first mentioned around the 8th to 10th centuries, in which period manuscripts preserving the inscriptions of Cosmas Indicopleustes (fl. 6th century) contain notes on his writings including the mention of a tribe called Tigretes.

Tigrinyas, Tigrayans and Tigre 

In Eritrea the Tigrinya people are referred to as Biher-Tigrinya people or the "Kebessa" people, kebessa meaning Eritrean highlands.
Both the Tigrinya and Tigre tribes in Eritrea are very close kin to the ethnic group Tigrayans in Tigray, Ethiopia. All the Tigrinyas, Tigre, and Tigrayans peoples were supposedly from the same group until the 8th century, and shared the Aksumite Kingdom before its demise.

These people grew apart in lexical, societal construction and dialect from around the 9th century. Tigrayans in Tigray abandoned the declining Kingdom of Aksum and the Tigrinya people built the kingdom of Medri Bahri in Eritrea by Bahre Negasi (also known as Bahre Negash; "king of the sea" in English) with its Capital in Debarwa, Seraye.

Origin 
It is believed that the first ancestors of the human race migrated to other parts of the world from this area. Bob Walter discovered the oldest evidence of stone tools near the coastal areas of Eritrea. The tools are believed to be 125,000 years old.

There were already people living on the Red Sea coast and Eritrean highlands from the Palaeolithic and the Neolithic ages.

Language 
Tigrinya is a North Ethiopic language. It is the most widely spoken language in Eritrea, and the fourth most spoken language in Ethiopia after Amharic.

Tigrinya dialects differ phonetically, lexically, and grammatically.

Settlements and kingdoms

Ona 
The oldest settled pastoral and agricultural community lived in Ona (the villages and towns around Asmara) around 800 BC. It was the oldest known indigenous culture in the Horn Africa. Archaeologist Peter Schmidt compared the Asmara settlement to Athens and Rome. The language known as Tigre was believed to be spoken in the region around 1000 BC.

D'mt Kingdom 
D'mt (Daamat) was believed to be home to a settled community in Southern Eritrean and Northern Ethiopia from around 8th century BC to 4th century BC. There is little archaeological evidence of the D'mt Kingdom.

Metera 
Metera was a major city in the Dʿmt and Aksumite kingdoms. Since Eritrean independence, the National Museum of Eritrea has petitioned the Ethiopian government to return artifacts removed from the site, though their efforts have been rebuffed. Hawulti, a pre-Aksumite or early Aksumite era obelisk, is situated here.

Qohaito 
Rock art near Qohaito appears to indicate habitation in the area since the fifth millennium BC, while the town is known to have survived until the sixth century. Mount Emba Soira, Eritrea's highest mountain, and a small successor village lies near the site.

Qohaito is often identified as the town Koloe described in the Periplus of the Erythraean Sea, a Greco-Roman document dated to the end of the first century, which thrived as a stop on the trade route between Adulis and Aksum. It is thought that crops were interspersed with buildings in the town. Old edifices included the pre-Christian Temple of Mariam Wakino and the Sahira Dam, which might also be pre-Aksumite.

The ruins at Qohaito were first located in 1868, though they were erroneously identified as a "Greek depot" at the time. A related site outside of Senafe, Matara, lies about 15 kilometres to the south and was excavated in the 1960s.

Medri Bahri Kingdom
After the decline of Aksum, the Eritrean highlands were under the domain of the Kingdom of Medri Bahrir, ruled by Bahr Negash. The area was then known as Ma'ikele Bahri ("between the seas/rivers", i.e. the land between the Red Sea and the Mareb River). Like Kingdom of Axum, Medri Bahri was also a Christian kingdom.

References 

Ethnic groups in Eritrea
Tigrinya language